Clonfert Cathedral is a cathedral of the Church of Ireland in Clonfert, County Galway in Ireland. It is in the ecclesiastical province of Dublin. Previously the cathedral of the Diocese of Clonfert, it is now one of three cathedrals in the United Dioceses of Limerick and Killaloe. 

The current building was erected in the 12th century at the site of an earlier 6th century church founded by Saint Brendan, which was associated with a monastery he founded and at which he was buried. The Dean of the Cathedral is the Very Reverend Roderick Lindsay Smyth who is also Dean of Killaloe, Dean of Kilfenora and both Dean and Provost of Kilmacduagh.

Description of the cathedral
The earliest part of the church dates back to around 1180. Its doorway is the crowning achievement of Hiberno-Romanesque style. It is in six orders, and has a large variety of motifs, animal heads, foliage, human heads etc. Above the doorway is a pointed hood enclosing triangles alternating with bizarre human heads, and below this is an arcade enclosing more human heads. The early 13th century east windows in the chancel is an example of a late Romanesque windows. The chancel arch was inserted in the 15th century, and is decorated with angels, a rosette and a mermaid carrying a mirror. The supporting arches of the tower at the west end of the church are also decorated with 15th century heads, and the innermost order of the Romanesque doorway was also inserted at this time. The sacristy is also 15th century. The church had a Romanesque south transept, which is now in ruins, and a Gothic north transept, which has been removed. In the Roman Catholic church one mile to the south is a 14th-century wooden statue of the Madonna and Child, and on the roadside near this church is a 16th-century tower-house.

Preservation
Clonfert Cathedral was included in the 2000 World Monuments Watch by the World Monuments Fund. The soft sandstone structure had weathered severely, and prior conservation efforts, which did not fully address all the building's problems, as well as substantial biological growth, had compounded the deterioration. Due to the limited resources of the dwindling congregation, American Express provided financial assistance through the organization.

Clonfert in the Annals
 561 - In which the battle of Cúl Dreimne is what is to be recorded, and in which Ainmire, son of Sétna, and Ainnedid son of Fergus, and Domnall were victors. Diarmait, however, was put to flight; and on this day Cluain Ferta Brénainn was founded at the order of an angel. [AU 558,  560, 561, 564; AU 558]
 636 - Repose of Carthach, abbot of Cluain Ferta Brénainn, who is called Ségán.
 752 - Repose of Cúángus, abbot of Liath Mo-Chaemóc, and repose of Fiachna grandson of Maicnia, abbot of Cluain Ferta Brénainn.
 802 - Repose of Ólchobar, abbot of Cluain Ferta Brénainn.
 817 - Connmach ua Cathail, wise man of Cluain Fearta Brenainn, died.
 820 - Laithbheartach, son of Aenghus, Bishop of Cluain Fearta Brenainn ... died.
 838 - A great assembly of the men of Ireland in Cluain Ferta Brénainn, and Niall son of Aed, king of Temuir, submitted to Feidlimid, son of Crimthann, so that Feidlimid became full king of Ireland that day, and he occupied the abbot's chair of Cluain Ferta.
 866 - Tomrar the Jarl, plundered Cluain Ferta Brénainn, and Brénainn killed him on [the] third day after he had reached his camp.
 949  - The spoiling of Sil-Anmchadha (Síol Anmchadha), and the plundering of Cluain-fearta-Brenainn, by Ceallachan and the men of Munster.
 971  - Cinaedh of the Oratory, anchorite of Cluain-fearta, died.
 1045 - Clonfert, with its church, was burned by the Ui-Maine. Cuchonnacht, son of Gadhra Ua Dunadhaigh, was there slain.
 1112 - Mael Maire Ua Fócarta, coarb of Brénainn, rested in Christ.
 1136 - Domhnall Ua Dubhthaigh, Archbishop of Connaught ... died after mass and celebration at Cluain-fearta-Brenainn.
 1162 - The relics of Bishop Maeinenn and of Cummaine Foda were removed from the earth by the clergy of Brenainn, and they were enclosed in a protecting shrine.
 1170 - Cormac Ua Lumluini, lector of Cluain-fearta-Brenainn, the remnant of the sages of Ireland in his time, died.
 1179 - Clonfert-Brendan, with its churches, were burned.
 1186 - Maelcallann, son of Adam Mac Clerken, Bishop of Clonfert-Brendan, died.
 1190 - A meeting was held at Clonfert-Brendan, to conclude a peace between Cathal Crovderg and Cathal Carragh. All the Sil-Murray repaired to this meeting, together with the successor of St. Patrick, Conor Mac Dermot, and Aireaghtagh O'Rodiv; but they could not be reconciled to each other on this occasion. O'Conor and the Sil-Murray went to Clonmacnoise on that night, and early next morning embarked in their fleet, and sailed up the Shannon until they came to Lough Ree. A violent storm arose on the lake, by which their vessels were separated from each other; and the storm so agitated the vessel in which O'Conor was, that it could not be piloted. Such was the fury of the storm, it foundered, and all the crew perished, except O'Conor himself and six others. In this vessel with O'Conor (Cathal Crovderg) were Areaghtagh O'Rodiv and Conor, son of Cathal, who were both drowned, as were also Conor and Auliffe, the two sons of Hugh Mageraghty; O'Mulrenin, and the son of O'Monahan, and many others.
 1195 - Donnell Ó Finn, Coarb of Clonfert-Brendan, died.
 1202 - Murtough O'Carmacan, Bishop of Clonfert-Brendan, died.
 1266 - A bishop-elect came from Rome to Clonfert-Brendan, and the dignity of bishop was conferred on him, and on TomásÓ  Mhiadhachán, at Athenry, on the Sunday before Christmas.

References

External links
Article on Clonfert from the Catholic Encyclopedia
Ecclesiastical history of Ireland, from the first introduction of Christianity to the beginning of the thirteenth century, John Lanigan, 1829

See also
 Abbot of Clonfert
 Bishop of Clonfert
 Dean of Killaloe and Clonfert
 Cormac mac Ceithearnach
 List of abbeys and priories in the Republic of Ireland (County Galway)
 List of cathedrals in Ireland

Anglican cathedrals in the Republic of Ireland
Diocese of Limerick and Killaloe
Churches in County Galway
Romanesque architecture
Pre-Reformation Roman Catholic cathedrals